Shiao Yu-jan (born 9 December 1999) is a Taiwanese artistic gymnast. In 2018, he represented Chinese Taipei at the 2018 Asian Games held in Jakarta, Indonesia without winning a medal.

In 2019, he competed at the 2019 World Artistic Gymnastics Championships held in Stuttgart, Germany, where he qualified to represent Chinese Taipei at the 2020 Summer Olympics in Tokyo, Japan.

References

External links 
 

Living people
1999 births
Place of birth missing (living people)
Taiwanese male artistic gymnasts
Gymnasts at the 2018 Asian Games
Asian Games competitors for Chinese Taipei
Gymnasts at the 2020 Summer Olympics
Olympic gymnasts of Taiwan
21st-century Taiwanese people